Jacob Rice (1787–1879) was  a  farmer from Henniker, New Hampshire and member of the New Hampshire House of Representatives, serving from 1828 to 1829.

Personal background and family relations
Jacob Rice was born in Henniker, New Hampshire on 23 January 1787 to Elijah Rice and Margaret (Patterson) Rice. He married Lovisa Howe and was a farmer in Henniker. In 1828 he was elected to the New Hampshire House of Representatives where he served one two-year term. Rice died at his home in Henniker on 14 April 1879. Jacob Rice was a direct descendant of Edmund Rice, an early immigrant to Massachusetts Bay Colony, as follows:

 Jacob Rice, son of
 Elijah Rice (1750-1805), son of
 Elijah Rice (1719-1785), son of
 Charles Rice (1684-1773), son of
 Thomas Rice (1654-1747), son of
 Thomas Rice (1626-1681), son of
 Edmund Rice, (ca1594-1663)

References 

1787 births
1879 deaths
19th-century American politicians
Members of the New Hampshire House of Representatives
People from Henniker, New Hampshire